Herrick is a surname. Notable people with the surname include:

People
Anson Herrick (1812–1868), Representative from New York
Charles Judson Herrick (1868–1960), neurologist and member of the National Academy of Sciences
Christopher Herrick, noted organist
D-Cady Herrick (1846–1926), New York judge and politician
Edward Claudius Herrick (1811-1862), American librarian
Francis Hobart Herrick (1858–1940), American writer, ornithologist and Professor of Biology
Glenn Washington Herrick (1870–1965), American entomologist
Henry Herrick, burgess for Warwick County, Virginia in 1644-1645, said to be a nephew of Thomas Herrick
Jack Herrick, founder of wikiHow
James Herrick (disambiguation), any of several people
Jim Herrick (born 1944), British philosopher
John Herrick (disambiguation)
Lott R. Herrick (1871–1937), American jurist
Margaret Herrick, a past director of the Academy of Motion Picture Arts and Sciences
Michael Herrick (1921–1944), New Zealand flying ace of the Second World War
Myron T. Herrick (1854–1929), Governor of Ohio
Richard Herrick, the first living kidney recipient, who received it from his twin brother Ronald
Ronald Herrick, the first donor of a living kidney transplant, who donated it to his twin Richard
Robert Herrick (disambiguation), any of several people
Ruth Herrick (1889–1983), director of the Women's Royal New Zealand Naval Service
Sophia Bledsoe Herrick (1837–1919), American writer and editor
Thomas Herrick, Heyrick or Heyricke, a member of the Virginia House of Burgesses, the elected lower house of the colonial Virginia General Assembly, from the "Upper Part of" Elizabeth City, Virginia, later Elizabeth City County, Virginia, now Hampton, Virginia, in 1629–1630
Walter R. Herrick (1877–1953), New York politician
William Herrick (MP), (1562-1653), English goldsmith and Member of Parliament

Fictional characters
William Herrick, character in BBC3's Being Human (UK TV series)

See also
Harrick, surname